Tonsure is a men's wear brand based out of Copenhagen, Denmark.

History
Tonsure was founded by Malte Flagstad in 2013. The brand won the Danish Design Talent Award in 2015 and the international Woolmark Prize in the men's wear category in 2017.

Headquarters
The company is based in the Christians Plejehus complex at Store Kongensgade 108B in central Copenhagen. The building is a former home for army veterans and was now heritage listed.

Distribution
The company operates a web store and is also sold through the following fashion stores:

Australia
Brisbane
 Contra

China
Hong Kong 
 Kapok

Denmark
Copenhagen
 Storm
 LOT #29
 Samsøe & Samsøe, Købmagergade

Zealand 
 Louisiana, Humlebæk
 Mr. Harris, Kongens Lyngby
 Who Dresses Who, Køge
 Mr. Team, Holbæk
 Illum, Roskilde
 Studio 12, Næstved

Fyn
 Dr. Adam's, Odense
 Hyper, Svendborg

Jutland
 Kul & Koks, Kolding
 Butler, Aalborg
 Co Exist, Esbjerg
 Homme Femme Store, Horsens
 Poul Iversen, Vejle

Germany
Berlin
 BAERCK

Mannheim
 Dipol

Japan
Fukuoka
 Hues
 Birthday

Kagawa
 Tronica

Kumamoto
 Idiome

Kyoto
 Prophet

Hokkaido
 Modest

Nagoya
 L.H.P.
 Goldkiss
 Unlimited

Tokyo
 Beams International Gallery
 1LDK
 Links
 Ships
 Maidens shop

Yamagayta
 Gea

Iceland
Reykjavik
 GK Reykjavik

Sweden
Stockholm
 Aplace Norrlandsgatan
 Aplace Brunogallerian

Malmö
 Aplace

United Kingdom
London
 AcerAnderson.com

References

External links
 Official website

Clothing companies of Denmark
Clothing companies based in Copenhagen
Danish brands
Companies based in Copenhagen Municipality
Danish companies established in 2013